Moritz Horst Lampert (born 14 May 1992) is a German professional golfer who currently plays on the Challenge Tour. He played on the European Tour in 2013 and 2015 but failed to regain his card on both occasions. He won three events on the 2014 Challenge Tour, reaching a career-high of 146 in the world rankings during that year.

Amateur career
Lampert had an accomplished junior career winning national boys titles in France and Germany in 2010. As a junior, Lampert played on national and European teams including in the Junior Ryder Cup (twice) and the Jacques Léglise Trophy (twice).

Lampert continued his success at junior level into his senior amateur career winning the Portuguese International Amateur in February 2012, and followed this up with a win in the German International Amateur in July of the same year.

Following this, Lampert went on to represent Germany at the 2012 Eisenhower Trophy in a team with Marcel Schneider and Max Rottluff, Lampert individually finished third and the German team finished in a tie for third behind the United States and Mexico alongside South Korea and France. He also represented Europe at the Bonallack Trophy and St Andrews Trophy.

In 2012. still as an amateur, Lampert played all three stages and finished T-4 at the European Tour Qualifying School earning him his playing rights on the European Tour for 2013. Immediately following this result, Lampert turned professional in preparation for the 2013 season.

Professional career
Lampert had an unsuccessful first season as a professional making only four cuts in 22 events on the 2013 European Tour, eventually finishing in 184th on Race to Dubai and losing his European Tour playing rights for the 2014 season. He also finished 109th in the 2013 Challenge Tour Order of Merit, to earn a low exemption category for the 2014 Challenge Tour.

For the 2014 season, Lampert played on the Challenge Tour, initially with invitations, and the Germany-based EPD Tour. He recorded his first victory as a professional at the EPD Tour's Open Al Maaden in Morocco. Following this, Lampert recorded his first win on the Challenge tour at the Kärnten Golf Open in May 2014. He followed this up with further wins on the challenge tour at the Fred Olsen Challenge de España in June and the Azerbaijan Golf Challenge Open in August. The third win of the season meant that Lampert earned direct promotion to the European Tour for the remainder of 2014 and all of 2015. Lampert lost his Tour card after the 2015 season. He won an event on the third-tier ProGolf Tour in preparation for the Challenge Tour.

Amateur wins
2010 Trophee Michel Carlhian (French International Juniors), German Boys Open
2012 German International Amateur, Portuguese International Amateur

Professional wins (7)

Challenge Tour wins (3)

Pro Golf Tour wins (4)

Team appearances
Amateur
Junior Ryder Cup (representing Europe): 2008, 2010
European Boys' Team Championship (representing Germany): 2009 2010
Jacques Léglise Trophy (representing the Continent of Europe): 2009, 2010 (winners)
European Amateur Team Championship (representing Germany): 2011
Bonallack Trophy (representing Europe): 2012 (winners)
Eisenhower Trophy (representing Germany): 2012
St Andrews Trophy (representing the Continent of Europe): 2012 (winners)

See also
2012 European Tour Qualifying School graduates
2014 Challenge Tour graduates
List of golfers to achieve a three-win promotion from the Challenge Tour

References

External links

German male golfers
European Tour golfers
People from Schwetzingen
Sportspeople from Karlsruhe (region)
1992 births
Living people